The AO-46 was a gas-operated 5.45×39mm caliber, compact carbine/assault rifle prototype. It features a folding stock and the trigger is located just in front of the magazine, which doubles as a pistol grip. In order to minimize the length of the gun, gas for automatic operation was collected not out of the barrel, but directly from the flash suppressor in the muzzle. Despite having the latter feature, the combination of a relative powerful cartridge and short barrel produced a flash comparable to that of a sawed-off shotgun.

The weapon was an unsolicited design by Peter Andreevich Tkachev working at TsNIITochMash. Although not accepted for service, this design, in combination with report of the US use of the XM-177 in Vietnam led the GRAU to start the competition known as Project Modern, which led to the adoption of AKS-74U for service.

Although the Soviet doctrine did not have an equivalent concept, the AO-46 design corresponds to the Western concept of personal defense weapon (PDW).

See also
 List of Russian weaponry
 Modern Sub Machine Carbine
 TKB-408
 TKB-059

References

5.45×39mm assault rifles
Personal defense weapons
Kalashnikov derivatives
Assault rifles of the Soviet Union
Trial and research firearms of the Soviet Union
TsNIITochMash products